The York Early Music Festival is an English arts festival devoted mainly to classical music from the 18th century and earlier. It was established in 1977, and takes place in York each July, organised by the National Centre for Early Music, York. The performances are at various venues such as York Minster, the Sir Jack Lyons Concert Hall at the University of York and the National Centre for Early Music, St Margaret's, Walmgate. In 2008, events also took place at Harewood House and the National Railway Museum.  In December there is also a Christmas Early Music Festival.

Artists who have appeared in the festival include

Robin Blaze
The Ebor Singers
Emma Kirkby
Ex Cathedra
I Fagiolini
Mahan Esfahani
Giles Lewin
Monica Huggett
Josetxu Obregon
The Orchestra of the Age of Enlightenment
Rachel Podger
Jordi Savall
The Sixteen
Hopkinson Smith
Taverner Consort and Players

External links 
York Early Music Festival website

Music in York
Music festivals in North Yorkshire
Early music festivals
Classical music festivals in England
1977 establishments in England
Music festivals established in 1977
Festivals in York